Sepulveda Elementary School may refer to:

 Sepulveda Elementary School (Santa Ana, California)
 Sepulveda Elementary School (Torrance, California)
 Sepulveda Elementary School (Sparks, Nevada)